Robert Foster Matthews Jr. (September 14, 1923 – October 30, 2010) was an American lawyer and politician.

Born in Shelbyville, Kentucky, Matthews served in the United States Navy during World War II. He received his bachelor's degree from the College of William & Mary and his law degree from the University of Virginia School of Law. Matthews practiced law and served as Kentucky Commissioner of Finance from 1960 to 1963. From 1964 to 1968, Matthews served as Kentucky Attorney General. In 1968, he ran for the office of Lieutenant Governor of Kentucky and lost the election to Wendell Ford. After he left office, Matthews continued to practice law and was chief administrative hearing officer for the city of Louisville and later Shelbyville, Kentucky.

Notes

1923 births
2010 deaths
People from Shelbyville, Kentucky
College of William & Mary alumni
University of Virginia School of Law alumni
Kentucky Attorneys General
United States Navy personnel of World War II